Daniel Tai Manu is an Australian former rugby union footballer who played as flanker. He is of Tongan origin.

Career
Manu was born in Tonga and educated at Penrose High School, in Auckland. He played for Auckland U18 and U20 teams, as well the senior team in the National Provincial Championship. After moving to Australia in 1994, Manu joined Eastwood and the following year, he played for the New South Wales representative team. Manu first made his first international test cap for Australia in the 1995 Rugby World Cup, against Romania, in Stellenbosch, at the Danie Craven Stadium, on 3 June 1995 when he was subbed on in the 28th minute as a substitute for David Wilson, and then subbed off in the 35th minute. His last cap for the Wallabies was on 2 August 1997, against South Africa, in Brisbane, at Lang Park. Manu is most known for his textbook tackle on New Zealand winger Jonah Lomu during his second Bledisloe Cup test at Eden Park in Auckland. He also played in the Super 14 since its inception for New South Wales Waratahs until his retirement in 2000. Between 2011 and 2013, Manu was appointed as coach for West Harbour RFC first-grade team. Currently, as of 2019, Manu was appointed Managing Director of CT Checkout Australia, a computer security company.

Personal life
He is uncle to Nasi Manu, who plays for Tonga at international level, whose cousin Sika Manu is a rugby league player.

Daniel is married to Elsa and they have 5 children

References

External links

Daniel Manu at New Zealand Rugby History

1970 births
Living people
Australian rugby union players
Australia international rugby union players
Tongan emigrants to Australia
Rugby union flankers
New South Wales Waratahs players
Auckland rugby union players